The 2000 FIA GT Magny-Cours 500 km was the tenth and final round the 2000 FIA GT Championship season.  It took place at the Circuit de Nevers Magny-Cours, France, on October 22, 2000.

Official results
Class winners in bold.  Cars failing to complete 70% of winner's distance marked as Not Classified (NC).

Statistics
 Pole position – #15 Lister Storm Racing – 1:36.215
 Fastest lap – #15 Lister Storm Racing – 1:37.249
 Average speed – 149.760 km/h

References

 
 

M
FIA GT